The 27th Genie Awards were held on February 13, 2007 to honour films released in 2006. The ceremony was located at the Carlu theatre in Toronto.

The Rocket (Maurice Richard) was the most successful film at these awards, winning nine of its 13 nominated categories. Bon Cop, Bad Cop won just two of its 10 nominations, although it received the highest 2006 box office revenues in Canada to earn the Golden Reel Award.

Nominees

Nominees were announced 9 January 2007.

Films with the most nominations:
13: The Rocket (Maurice Richard)
10: Bon Cop, Bad Cop
7: A Sunday in Kigali (Un dimanche à Kigali)
6: Tideland
5: Eve and the Fire Horse
5: The Secret Life of Happy People (La Vie secrète des gens heureux)
4: Cheech
4: The Little Book of Revenge (Guide de la petite vengeance)
4: Snow Cake

Winners

External links
Genie Awards official site

27
Genie
Genie